W. Scott Sorrels is an American attorney at law. Sorrels was a partner of the law firm Sutherland Asbill & Brennan LLP, a law firm headquartered in Atlanta, Georgia. He is the 12th National Commissioner of the Boy Scouts of America (BSA), starting in 2020.

Background
Sorrels graduated magna cum laude from Mercer University, later graduating from the University of Georgia School of Law.

Civic Involvement

Boy Scouts of America
He is an Eagle Scout, the highest rank attainable in the Scouts BSA program. He has been awarded the Vigil Honor from the Order of the Arrow, and the William H. Spurgeon III Award.

Sorrels has served many positions within the Scouts at the unit, council, area, and regional levels. He has served as the National Commissioner Service Chairman, vice chair for the National Venturing Committee, the Area 9 president for the Southern Region, Venturing chair for the Southern Region,

He is a past council president for the Northeast Georgia Council, and served on the boards of the Atlanta Area Council, and the Northeast Georgia Council. Sorrels was the co-chair of the 24th World Scout Jamboree.

Awards
Sorrels has been awarded with the Venturing Leadership Award, the District Award of Merit, Silver Beaver, Silver Antelope, Silver Buffalo and Distinguished Eagle Scout Award by the Boy Scouts of America.

He was awarded the Bronze Wolf Award by the World Scout Committee.

References

External links

 
 

University of Georgia School of Law alumni
Living people
Radio personalities from Atlanta
Mercer University alumni
Georgia (U.S. state) lawyers
National Commissioners of the Boy Scouts of America
Recipients of the Bronze Wolf Award
1956 births